Tjibbe is a masculine given name. Notable people with the name include:

Tjibbe Joustra (born 1951), Dutch civil servant
Tjibbe Veldkamp (born 1962), Dutch children's writer

Masculine given names